Bak So-ra (Hangul: 박소라) is a South Korean voice actress who joined the Munhwa Broadcasting Corporation's voice acting division in 1995.

Roles

Broadcast TV
Futari wa Pretty Cure (Korea TV Edition, Taeyoung SBS)
Futari wa Pretty Cure Max Heart (Korea TV Edition, CHAMP TV and ANIONE TV)
Ojamajo Doremi (Magical Remi from 1st - 3rd Series, Korea TV Edition, Munhwa Broadcasting Corporation and 4th series, Korea TV Edition, Tooniverse Cartoon Network)
Buffy the Vampire Slayer (replacing Alyson Hannigan, Korea TV Edition, Munhwa Broadcasting Corporation)
Shadow Fighter (Munhwa Broadcasting Corporation)
Aqua Kids (Taeyoung SBS)
Olympus Guardian - The Myth of Greece and Rome (Taeyoung SBS)
Dr. Slump (Korea TV Edition, Munhwa Broadcasting Corporation)
Adventure King's Gulliver (Korea TV Edition, Munhwa Broadcasting Corporation)
Noah's Children (Korea TV Edition, Munhwa Broadcasting Corporation)
Iwoot (Radio Drama, Munhwa Broadcasting Corporation)
Cartoon Fight (Radio Drama, Munhwa Broadcasting Corporation)
Very Special Morning (narration, Munhwa Broadcasting Corporation)
Wa E-Nice World (narration, Munhwa Broadcasting Corporation)

Movie dubbing
Vanilla Sky (replacing Penélope Cruz, Korea TV Edition, Munhwa Broadcasting Corporation)
I Am Sam (replacing Dakota Fanning, Korea TV Edition, Munhwa Broadcasting Corporation)
The Butterfly Effect (replacing Irene Gorovaia, Korea TV Edition, Munhwa Broadcasting Corporation)
Blade (Korea TV Edition, Munhwa Broadcasting Corporation)
Taekeukkwon 2 (Korea TV Edition, Munhwa Broadcasting Corporation)
007 Series (Korea TV Edition, Munhwa Broadcasting Corporation)
Only You (Korea TV Edition, Munhwa Broadcasting Corporation)
Samurai Fiction (replacing Tamaki Ogawa, Korea TV Edition, Munhwa Broadcasting Corporation)
Mad Max (replacing Joanne Samuel, Korea TV Edition, Taeyoung SBS)
After the Sunset (replacing Salma Hayek, Korea TV Edition, Munhwa Broadcasting Corporation)

See also
Munhwa Broadcasting Corporation
MBC Voice Acting Division

References

External links
Daum Cafe Voice Actor Bak So Ra 1st Fan Club (in Korean)
Daum Cafe Voice Actor Bak So Ra 2nd Fan Club (in Korean)
MBC Voice Acting division Bak So Ra Blog (in Korean)

Living people
South Korean voice actresses
Year of birth missing (living people)
Place of birth missing (living people)